Alexandru Lucian Olah (born 15 October 1993) is a Romanian basketball player for Rapid București of the Liga Națională. He also plays for the Romanian national team.

Professional career
On 20 January 2018, Olah signed a 2-week try-out contract with ZZ Leiden of the Dutch Basketball League (DBL). On 4 February, Leiden signed him for the remainder of the season.

International career
Olah participated at the EuroBasket 2017.

References

1993 births
Living people
Belfius Mons-Hainaut players
Centers (basketball)
CS Universitatea Cluj-Napoca (men's basketball) players
Expatriate basketball people in Belgium
Kangoeroes Basket Mechelen players
Northwestern Wildcats men's basketball players
Romanian expatriate basketball people in the United States
Romanian expatriates in Belgium
Romanian men's basketball players
Sportspeople from Timișoara